Redsquare (stylized as REDSQUARE) was a five-member South Korean girl group formed by About Entertainment and managed by ICONIC Music & Entertainment. The group debuted on May 19, 2020, with their single album Prequel.

History

Pre-debut 
4 members of Redsquare: Green, ChaeA, Ari, and Bomin are former members of Good Day, a girl group that was formed by C9 Entertainment. The group debuted on August 30, 2017, with their only EP All Day Good Day. After debut, Green participated in survival show The Unit with 5 other members. However, she was eliminated during the first elimination round and ranked 46th.

Lina originally debuted as a solo artist under About Entertainment, using the stage name Blenn, with her single album Do I Feel on March 16, 2020. She also appeared in musical productions and endorsed cosmetic brand LUI & LUI.

2020: Debut and new company  
On March 23, 2020, About Entertainment announced that they would debut their first 5-member girl group and subsequently released the first teaser. The company slowly revealed the members with their initials, followed by their full stage names.

The group debuted on May 19, 2020 with their single album Prequel, alongside the music video of the lead single "ColorFull". Also featured on prequel was a 46-second instrumental B-Side “Spoiler”, that was only accessible on the album’s physical CD.

On December 31, 2020, the group announced that they signed to a new company Iconic Music & Entertainment (ICONICMnE), a division of the entertainment and media production company Taewon Entertainment.

2022: Rebranding  
On June 12, 2022, it was announced that Redsquare rebranded into Irris, now managed by Justice Records (a newly launched music division of Taewon Entertainment) and Mellow Entertainment. Hence, this led to the disbandment of the group.

Members 
 Green (그린)
 Lina (리나)
 ChaeA (채아)
 Ari (아리)
 Bomin (보민)

Discography

Single albums

Singles

Filmography

Music videos

References 

South Korean girl groups
2020 establishments in South Korea
2022 disestablishments in South Korea
Musical groups established in 2020
Musical groups disestablished in 2022
Musical groups from Seoul
K-pop music groups